Karl Stumpp (12 May 1896 – 20 January 1982) was a German ethnographer of Black Sea German origin who devoted himself to the study of Germans in Eastern Europe and Southeastern Europe, especially those from the lands of the former Russian Empire. Starting out as a pre-war academic and teacher, during the German-Soviet portion of World War II, he led Special Command Unit Dr Karl Stumpp (also called in ), which had been named after him in honour of his prior work on Russian German ethnology. This operation sought to classify the inhabitants of ethnic German and Swedish settlements whom the Nazis favoured. It also classified those of other ethnicities including Ukrainians and Jews. In the postwar period, Stumpp escaped punishment for his wartime service to the Nazi regime. Instead, he returned to teaching and served as the long-time chairman of the Association of Germans from Russia, travelling to North America to visit and lecture to the Russian German diaspora communities there.

Early life 
Stumpp was born to ethnic German parents in Dobro-Olexandrivka (also called in ), near Odessa, in the Grossliebental district of the Kherson Governorate of the Russian Empire. At an early age he emigrated to Germany for his studies.

Stumpp's parents were Jakob Stumpp (1864-1918) and his wife Katharina nee König (1864-1945). After graduating from the German high school in Odessa, Stumpp studied from 1918-1922 at the Eberhard Karls University in Tübingen. There he participated in the founding of the Association of those studying German Colonists.

Professional life 
Since Stumpp's home village was now part of the Ukrainian Socialist Soviet Republic, he could not return. Instead, he went to neighbouring Bessarabia in Romania. From 1922 to 1933, he was a teacher at the senior girls' school in Tarutino. He voluntarily examined the history of Bessarabian Germans through enquiries in church documents and parish registers. From the villages, he requested the names of the persons who had emigrated from Bessarabia. Likewise, he made surveys on the land area of the Bessarabian Germans. Stumpp gave lectures to the ethnic German population in Bessarabia and founded a university library in Tarutino, which led to the establishment of German-language libraries in other Bessarabian German settlements. In 1922, he received his doctorate in philosophy. [1]

Involvement in Nazi Ethnographical Programmes 
In 1933, Stumpp went to National Socialist Germany, where, until 1938, he served as national director of the Institute for the Study of Germans Abroad (Deutsches Ausland Institut) in Stuttgart. He then headed the Russian-German office of the German Foreign Institute in Stuttgart. He was also a member of the Research Unit of the Russian Federation in Berlin.

During the German-Soviet campaign and occupation, Stumpp carried out ethnological and genealogical investigations in ethnic-German villages of occupied Ukraine on behalf of the German Foreign Institute and the Reich Ministry for the Occupied Eastern Territories (RMO). The 80-member Sonderkommando Dr. Karl Stumpp named for and led by him operated as a semi-military unit from summer 1941 to summer 1943 in occupied-Ukraine. [2] In 1942, changed its name Stumpp also as head of a Sonderkommando " clan customer and folk biology " at the Reich Commissioner for the Ukraine , these task forces the Einsatzstab Reichsleiter Rosenberg , ERR, and in particular had to rob archives. [3]

He made "village reports" to more than 300 villages in the area occupied by the German Army. The detailed demographic, cultural and racial studies for the Nazi bureaucracy and the SS established a basis for population policy control of Ukrainian villages and ethnic segregation of its population. [4] Even the archives of the resettled Germans from Russia secured the command. Many of his later works were based on this material and these studies. [5] Stumpp's superior in RMO in Berlin was his countryman, Georg Leibbrandt. 
In his diary entry of August 6, 1941, Stumpp spoke of the "liberation of Germany and Europe from the Bolshevik Jewish plague" for which German soldiers sacrificed their lives. He went on to write in the same entry as "a light was shining" on a young German air force lieutenant who served with the Red Army when he realized that "no Jew" was risking his life as a pilot on the Red Army "Because it takes courage". [6]

In 1941, Stumpp came into contact with the assassination of the Jews by Einsatzgruppen C and D and their helpers in Ukraine and Transnistria (Romanian occupation area). Stumpp is accused of having set up a list of 42,000 "unsustainable Jews " in his ethnological research. He is also accused of having participated in the murder of Jews.[7]

After the Second World War, Stumpp was a high school teacher in Tübingen until 1957. He also served as editor of Volk auf dem Weg [People on the way] the organ of Association of Germans from Russia.

Post-war life 
Stumpp escaped any repercussions for his involvement in the apparatus of the Nazi-occupation of Ukraine during World War II. 

In the post-war period, he returned to teaching and resumed his earlier studies on the subject of the Russian Germans, making expert contributions to the Association of Germans from Russia (the Landsmannschaft der Deutschen aus Russland, which might be literally translated as the "Cultural Association of Germans from Russia") until his death in Stuttgart on 20 January 1982.

Post-war German Federal Republican Honours 
 Federal Cross of Merit 1st Class (1966) [8]
 Medal of Merit of the Institute for Foreign Cultural Relations (1975)

Publications 
 From the Original Homeland and emigration of the Germans from Bessarabien. 
 1938 Yearbook for Foreign Germans. 
 East migration of the Württemberger 1816 to 1822.
 The emigration from Germany to Russia in the years 1763 to 1862. 1974 [1] .
 The Germans from Russia - two hundred years on the road. 1965th
 A life for my people. 
 Home Calendar of the Bessarabian Germans 1978, Hannover 1978.

Literature

References 

1896 births
1982 deaths
People from Kherson Governorate
Ukrainian people of German descent
Russian and Soviet-German people
German ethnographers
Officers Crosses of the Order of Merit of the Federal Republic of Germany
SS personnel
Emigrants from the Russian Empire to Germany